The Longsnout Bellowfish (Notopogon macrosolen) is a species of fish from the family Macroramphosidae. It is found in the Southeast Atlantic Ocean, from southern Namibia to Saldanha Bay in South Africa.

References

Further reading
WoRMS

macrosolen
Marine fish
Fish described in 1925